Brian Verbeek (born October 22, 1966) is a Canadian former professional ice hockey centre. He is the younger brother of former NHL player Pat Verbeek.

Verbeek was drafted 242nd overall by the Hartford Whalers in the 1986 NHL Entry Draft. He turned professional the same year, spending a season with the Salt Lake Golden Eagles of the International Hockey League. He then played a season in Finland, playing two games in SM-liiga for KooKoo and 17 games in the 1. Divisioona for Karhu-Kissat. Verbeek then played 27 games for the American Hockey League's Binghamton Whalers during the 1988–89 season.

References

External links

1966 births
Living people
Binghamton Whalers players
Boxers de Bordeaux players
Canadian ice hockey centres
Hartford Whalers draft picks
Kingston Canadians players
KooKoo players
Salt Lake Golden Eagles (IHL) players
ECD Sauderland players
Sudbury Wolves players
Whitley Warriors players